The 2018–19 Longwood Lancers men's basketball team represented Longwood University during the 2018–19 NCAA Division I men's basketball season. They were led by head coach Griff Aldrich, in his first season, and played their home games at Willett Hall in Farmville, Virginia as members of the Big South Conference. They finished the season 16–18, 5–11 in Big South play to finish in ninth place. They lost in the first round of the Big South tournament to Hampton. They were invited to the College Basketball Invitational, their first ever Division I postseason tournament, where they defeated Southern Miss in the first round before losing in the quarterfinals to DePaul.

Previous season
The 2017–18 Lancers finished the season 7–26, 3–15 in Big South play to finish in last place. They defeated High Point in the first round of the Big South tournament to advance to the quarterfinals where they lost to Radford.

On March 2, 2018, head coach Jayson Gee was fired. He finished at Longwood with a five-year record of 42–120. On March 22, the school hired UMBC assistant Griff Aldrich as head coach.

Roster

Schedule and results

|-
!colspan=12 style=| Non-conference regular season

|-
!colspan=12 style=| Big South regular season

|-
!colspan=12 style=| Big South Conference tournament

|-
!colspan=12 style=| College Basketball Invitational

References

Longwood Lancers men's basketball seasons
Longwood
Long
Long
Longwood